Sheriff of Sundown is a 1944 American Western film.

Plot
When cattleman Tex Jordan (Lane) and his friends Chihuahua Ramirez (Renaldo) and Third Grade Simms (Terhune) bring their cattle to market in Sundown, Texas near the Mexican border, they learn the broker Jack Hatfield (Barcroft) is using a sliding pay scale. The larger the herd, the more he pays per head, squeezing the small ranchers like Andy Craig (Kirk). When Craig threatens to disclose the practice, he is murdered.

Sheriff Tom Carpenter (London) asks for evidence in the murder investigation, and he is also murdered. Governor Brainerd (Rawlinson) becomes involved and authorizes Jordan to act on his behalf to uncover who is behind the murders.

Cast
Allan Lane – Tex Jordan
Tom London – Sheriff Tom Carpenter 
Roy Barcroft – Jack Hatfield
Max Terhune – Third Grade Simms
Duncan Renaldo – Chihuahua Ramirez
Herbert Rawlinson – Governor Brainerd 
Jack Kirk – Andy Craig
Bud Geary – Ward

References

External links
 
 
 
 

1944 films
1944 Western (genre) films
American black-and-white films
American Western (genre) films
Films directed by Lesley Selander
1940s English-language films
1940s American films